Zuckermandel or Zuckermandl is a surname. Notable people with the surname include:

 Moses Samuel Zuckermandl (1836-1917),  Czech-German rabbi
 Lorenz Zuckermandel (1847-1928), German banker, investor and translator of Dante Alighieri's Divine Comedy
 Gustaf Zuckermandel, Jr., fictional character in the Left Behind series

Zuckermandel or Zuckermantel is also an area in Bratislava, Slovakia, part of the historical Podhradie.